Events from the year 1895 in Russia.

Incumbents
 Monarch – Nicholas II

Events

 1895 Yaroslavl Great Manufacture strike
 Alchevsk
 Malyshev Factory
 Rīgas Vagonbūves Rūpnīca
 Russian Museum

Births

Deaths

References

1895 in Russia
Years of the 19th century in the Russian Empire